Sunilam, formerly known as Sunil Mishra (born 27 July 1961), is an Indian socialist politician, writer, and former physicist. As of the mid-1990s, he served as the national general secretary of the Yuva Janata Dal.

Politics
He took part in founding the Socialist Front in the early 2000s. As of 2008, he served as the national secretary of the Samajwadi Party. He holds a doctorate and was an activist of the Hind Mazdoor Kisan Panchayat. He is also the president of the Madhya Pradesh Kisan Sangarsh Samiti (MPKSS, 'Peasant Struggle Association'), based in Multai. As a politician, he was repotedly non-corrupt.

In 2006 Sunilam formed part of a seven-member delegation, led by Sitaram Yechury, that visited Nepal to show support for the pro-democracy movement there.

In 2004 Sunilam finished third in the contest for the Betul Lok Sabha seat, obtaining 74,391 votes. At the time of the election, he had 41 criminal cases registered against him. In 2008 he contested a by-election for the same seat, but lost his deposit.

Early life 
Sunil Mishra was born on 27 July 1961, at Govt. Sultaniya Hospital in Bhopal, India.

His primary to higher-secondary studies were carried out in Kendriya Vidyalaya, Gwalior. He graduated from Govt. Science College, Gwalior and completed his post-graduate Msc Applied Physics from M.I.T.S., Gwalior's engineering college. Sunilam received a PhD in Bio-Medical Electronics from Delhi University.not research. After returning from Burn's Institute, Melbourne, he became a full-time political worker.

Sunilam also took the responsibility of editing Georage Fernandez' Pratipaksha newspaper. He also managed the editorial work of Nayachakra Magazine of Shri Ram Vilas Paswan.

Through Samajwadi Yuvjan Sabha, he as a schoolchild, participated in a rally demonstration against emergency events. He was district president of Yuva Janata Dal. Later he was the National General Secretary of Yuva Janta for 10 years.

Sunilam was elected International Vice-President of International Union of Socialist Youth (an organisation of socialist youths of 120 countries connected to Socialist International) in Milan, Italy. He travelled widely to represent the youth of India, in 60 countries of the world, and he kept his analysis in front of the world during presentations.

Being the founder President of Kisan Sangharsh Samiti (Farmers Struggle Committee), he offered his leadership for Kisan Andolans. He was sent to prison for three months, after his arrest in Kisan Andolan at Multai, M.P, where 24 innocent farmers/kisans were shot dead and 250 injured under police firing on 12 January 1998 (1998 Multai Farmers Massacre). Congress Government has lodged 66 false cases against Dr Sunilam and his associate farmers in one single incident of police firing in Multai. Every month, Kisan sangharsh Samiti, Madhya Pradesh organises the Kisan Mahapanchayat (General Meeting of Farmers).  On 12 January 2011, the 175th Kisan Mahapanchayat was organised.

In 1998, Sunilam won the legislative assembly seat of Multai, by a margin of 50% votes. He contested this seat as People's candidate of farmers community (Jan Ummidawar of Kisan community) in Kisan mahapanchayat. Later, with the help of various Madhya Pradesh kisan sangathans, he made Kisan-Mazdoor-Adiwasi Kranti Dal, which merged with the Samajwadi Party; he again won the Multai assembly seat in 2003, with 60% of polled votes. He was made the Leader of the Samajwadi Legislative Party of Madhya Pradesh, by party president Shri Mulayam Singh Yadavj, and he was also appointed as National Secretary of Samajwadi Party.

Published work 
Dr. Sunilam published and co-authored two books. In Samajwadi Andolan ke Dastavej (in Hindi with Prof. Vinod Prasad Singh), he collected various facts and papers relating to Samajwadi Andolan. In English he prepared a book with Shri Surendra Mohan, the late shri HariDev Sharma and Prof. V.P. Singh titled "Evolution of Socialist Policy in India". Sunilam also compiled a book on Urvasiam lohia of the northeastern frontier. Sunilam continues to write articles in national newspapers and local dailies.

Offices 
Sunilam is a managing trustee of Lohiya's Samta Adivasi kendra at the village Urdan, Panchayat Jamadhi, Betul. For almost a decade, he was monitor for CAPART, evaluating various projects.  He is active with many kisan and Jan sangathans (social groups), like INSAF, NAPM, Coordination Committee of farmers organisation, collision for GM free India, Yusuf Meher Ali yuva biradari, Rastriya Seva dal Sangathan, and Socialist Front.

Travels 
Sunilam has travelled the length and breadth of Madhya Pradesh states three times, covering  for various campaigns. During Dr Ram Manohar's birth-centenary year, Sunilam travelled by road through 21 states and completed . Saptakranti Vichar yatra was organised by Rastriya Seva Dal and Yusuf Meher Ali Yuva Biradari. On the occasion of the birth centenary year of Mama Baleshwar Dayal, Sunilam started from Nivarikala (Etawa, U.P) and travelled in Samta yatra to Jhabua. The next month, Sunilam has undertaken Saptakranti Vichar yatra to northeastern states.

He is also National Secretary of the Indian solidarity committee for Freedom Democracy and Human Rights and National President of Bhutan Solidarity, which is fighting for Democracy in Bhutan. He is also supporting the movement for restoration of Democracy in Burma and Freedom of Tibet, In the last nineteen years, Sunilam has organised 150 youth camps in various parts of India, for training young socialists.

Different governments have imposed 132 court cases against him. In one of the politically motivated and fabricated Court Case from Multai farmers stir, he was life sentenced, which seems political forces have acted against Farmer leader Dr. Sunilam. The social activist group in India are surprised to see the decision against Dr. Sunilam. The detailed report of multiple case that were imposed on Dr.Sunilam could be studied on sanhati.com He has been arrested more than 125 times. Still he is fighting for the cause. He is regularly writing articles for Hindi daily Jansatta, Aaj Samaj, People's Samachar, Khabaryaar weekly, Sputanik weekly, Mahabeer Samata Sandesh Weekly, in Hindi and English, Janta weekly and English monthly The Otherside.

References

External links
 http://www.tribuneindia.com/2009/20090927/bathinda.htm
 http://eci.nic.in/archive/website_2/S12/138/Dr_Sunilam/Dr_Sunilam.htm
 
 

1961 births
Living people
Kendriya Vidyalaya alumni
Politicians from Bhopal
Samajwadi Party politicians
20th-century Indian politicians
Writers from Bhopal
Indian political writers
Madhya Pradesh MLAs 1998–2003
Madhya Pradesh MLAs 2003–2008